Teriomima parva, the poor buff, is a butterfly in the family Lycaenidae. It is found in Kenya, Tanzania and possibly Mozambique. The habitat consists of coastal and submontane forests.

The larvae probably feed on tree lichens.

Subspecies
Teriomima parva parva (coast of Kenya, Tanzania: coast and inland up to Amani, possibly the coast of Mozambique)
Teriomima parva beylissi Henning & Henning, 2004 (Tanzania: Manga Forest Reserve)

References

Butterflies described in 1933
Poritiinae